Barbodes manguaoensis is a species of cyprinid fish endemic to Lake Manguao in Palawan, the Philippines.  This species can reach a length of  TL.

References

manguaoensis
Fish described in 1914
Taxonomy articles created by Polbot